Captain Sir James Alexander Lawson Duncan, 1st Baronet (1899 – 30 September 1974) was a British Conservative and National Liberal politician.

Born in Danville, Sir James served as Member of Parliament (MP) for the Conservative Party in Kensington North from 1931 to 1945 when he was defeated in the Labour landslide of 1945. He was returned to Parliament as a National Liberal as the first Member of Parliament for the newly created South Angus constituency in 1950, and served until his retirement in 1964. He later became the parliamentary chairman of the National Liberals between 1956 and 1959.

He was married to Adrienne St. Quinton. After the death of his first wife Sir James remarried in 1966 to Beatrice Mary Moore Oliphant (1910–2003), widow of Philip Blair Oliphant.

Duncan was created a baronet on 24 July 1957, of Jordanstone in the County of Perth; the title became extinct on his death.

References

External links 
 

1899 births
1974 deaths
Baronets in the Baronetage of the United Kingdom
Unionist Party (Scotland) MPs
Conservative Party (UK) MPs for English constituencies
Members of the Parliament of the United Kingdom for Scottish constituencies
UK MPs 1931–1935
UK MPs 1935–1945
UK MPs 1950–1951
UK MPs 1951–1955
UK MPs 1955–1959
UK MPs 1959–1964
Members of London County Council
National Liberal Party (UK, 1931) politicians